This chronology of the Paris Commune lists major events that occurred during and surrounding the Paris Commune, a revolutionary government that controlled Paris between March and May 1871.

1871 

 January 22: Uprising in Paris at the city hall ends with five dead
 January 28: Armistice of Versailles signed, de facto French surrender to the Prussians
 February 26: Treaty of Versailles ends the Franco-Prussian War
 March 1: Germans parade through Paris; National Guard Central Committee protests
 March 10: Assembly decides to move to Versailles, snubbing Paris
 March 18: Failed attempt to seize Monmartre cannons begins the Paris Commune
 March 22: Second Lyon Commune
 March 26: Elections replace the National Guard Central Committee governance with that of the Commune Council
 March 28: Proclamation of the Commune
 March 30: First skirmish between Communards and Versaillais at Courbevoie
 April 2: Versaillais return for Battle of Courbevoie, ending in Communard retreat
 April 3: 
 Battle of Rueil
 Battle of Meudon
 April 10: Commune Council makes legitimate and illegitimate children equally eligible for National Guard pensions
 April 11: Women's Union founded
 April 16: Commune approves worker takeover of abandoned workshops
 April 19: Commune program established in the Declaration to the French People
 April 24: Unions invited to organize abandoned workshops
 April 25 – May 9: Battle of Fort d'Issy
 April 28: 
 Committee of Public Safety discussions begin
 Commune bans baker night work
 May 1: 
 Commune's third phase begins as Commune forms Committee of Public Safety
 Louis Rossel replaces Gustave Paul Cluseret as Communard Delegate for War (defense minister)
 May 7: Commune banned pawnshop sale of vital pawned professions; paid for some possessions to be returned to their owners
 May 9: Louis Rossel steps down as Delegate for War
 May 10: Louis Charles Delescluze becomes Delegate for War
 May 15: Minority declaration of the Committee of Public Safety shows schism
 May 16: Vendome Column destroyed
 May 21: Commune Council's last session
 May 22–28: Semaine sanglante (Bloody Week)
 May 23: Jarosław Dąbrowski dies
 May 24: 
 Hostages executed
 Battle of Butte-aux-Cailles
 May 25: Louis Charles Delescluze dies
 May 28: Final barricades vanquished; Commune ends

Notes

References 

 
 
 
 
 

History of Paris
Paris Commune